Electoral history of Barry Goldwater, United States Senator from Arizona (1953–1965, 1969–1987) and Republican Party nominee for President of the United States during 1964 election

Phoenix City Council, At-large district, 1949:

Elected:
 Barry Goldwater – 16,405 (17.3%)
 Harry Rosenzweig – 14,887 (15.7%)
 Margaret B. Kober – 14,498 (15.3%)
 Frank G. Murphy – 13,598 (14.4%)
 Charles N. Walters – 12,838 (13.6%)
 Hohen Foster – 12,556 (13.3%)

Defeated:
 Rocky Ford – 4,678 (4.9%)
 Tony Grosso – 3,000 (3.2%)
 James H. Kerby – 2,177 (2.3%)

Phoenix City Council, At-large district, 1951:

Elected:
 Hohen Foster (inc.)
 Barry Goldwater (inc.)
 Margaret B. Kober (inc.)
 Frank G. Murphy (inc.)
 Harry Rosenzweig (inc.)
 Charles N. Walters (inc.)

Defeated:
 A.J. Beaty
 Guz Rodriguez
 Charles Romaine
 Calvin R. Sanders
 John W. Strode
 James A. Tilley, Sr.

Republican primary for the United States Senator (class 1) from Arizona, 1952:
 Barry Goldwater – 33,460 (91.0%)
 Lester K. Kahl – 3,297 (9.0%)

United States Senate election in Arizona, 1952:
 Barry Goldwater (R) – 132,063 (51.3%)
 Ernest McFarland (D) (inc.) – 125,338 (48.7%)

United States Senate election in Arizona, 1958:
 Barry Goldwater (R) (inc.) – 164,593 (56.1%)
 Ernest McFarland (D) – 129,030 (43.9%)

1960 Republican presidential primaries:
 Richard Nixon – 4,975,938 (86.6%)
 Unpledged – 314,234 (5.5%)
 George H. Bender – 211,090 (3.7%)
 Cecil H. Underwood – 123,756 (2.2%)
 James M. Lloyd – 48,461 (0.8%)
 Nelson Rockefeller – 30,639 (0.5%)
 Frank R. Beckwith – 19,677 (0.3%)
 John F. Kennedy – 12,817 (0.2%)
 Barry Goldwater – 3,146 (0.1%)
 Paul C. Fisher – 3,146 (0.1%)
 Henry Cabot Lodge, Jr. – 514 (0.0%)
 Dwight D. Eisenhower (inc.) – 172 (0.0%)
 Styles Bridges – 108 (0.0%)

1960 Republican National Convention (presidential tally):
 Richard Nixon – 1,321 (99.3%)
 Barry Goldwater – 10 (0.7%)

1960 United States presidential election:
 John F. Kennedy/Lyndon B. Johnson (D) – 34,220,984 (49.7%) and 303 electoral votes (22 states carried)
 Richard Nixon/Henry Cabot Lodge, Jr. (R) – 34,108,157 (49.6%) and 219 electoral votes (27 states carried)
 Harry F. Byrd/Strom Thurmond (I) – 286,359 (0.4%) and 14 electoral votes (2 states carried)
 Harry F. Byrd/Barry Goldwater (I) – 1 electoral vote (Oklahoma faithless elector)
 Orval Faubus/John G. Crommelin (National States' Rights) – 44,984 (0.1%)
 Charles L. Sullivan/Merritt Curtis (CST) – 18,162 (0.0%)

1964 Republican presidential primaries:
 Barry Goldwater – 2,267,079 (38.3%)
 Nelson Rockefeller – 1,304,204 (22.1%)
 James A. Rhodes – 615,754 (10.4%)
 Henry Cabot Lodge, Jr. – 386,661 (6.5%)
 John W. Byrnes – 299,612 (5.1%)
 William Scranton – 245,401 (4.2%)
 Margaret Chase Smith – 227,007 (3.8%)
 Richard Nixon – 197,212 (3.3%)
 Unpledged – 173,652 (2.9%)
 Harold Stassen – 114,083 (1.9%)

1964 Republican National Convention (presidential tally):
 Barry Goldwater – 883 (67.5%)
 William Scranton – 214 (16.4%)
 Nelson Rockefeller – 114 (8.7%)
 George W. Romney – 41 (3.1%)
 Margaret Chase Smith – 27 (2.1%)
 Walter Judd – 22 (1.7%)
 Hiram Fong – 5 (0.4%)
 Henry Cabot Lodge, Jr. – 2 (0.2%)

1964 United States presidential election:
 Lyndon B. Johnson/Hubert Humphrey (D) – 43,127,041 (61.1%) and 486 electoral votes (44 states and D.C. carried)
 Barry Goldwater/William E. Miller (R) – 27,175,754 (38.5%) and 52 electoral votes (6 states carried)
 Unpledged electors (D) – 210,732 (0.3%)

United States Senate election in Arizona, 1968:
 Barry Goldwater (R) – 274,607 (57.2%)
 Roy Elson (D) – 205,338 (42.8%)

United States Senate election in Arizona, 1974:
 Barry Goldwater (R) (inc.) – 320,396 (58.3%)
 Jonathan Marshall (D) – 229,523 (41.7%)

United States Senate election in Arizona, 1980:
 Barry Goldwater (R) (inc.) – 432,371 (49.5%)
 Bill Schultz (D) – 422,972 (48.4%)
 Fred R. Esser (Libertarian) – 12,008 (1.4%)
 Lorenzo Torrez (People over Politics) – 3,608 (0.4%)
 Josefina Otero (Socialist Workers) – 3,266 (0.4%)

References

Goldwater, Barry
Barry Goldwater